CoRoT-20c is an exoplanet found by the HARPS radial-velocity search terrestrial telescope.

It is a brown dwarf-sized stellar companion orbiting a G2V star with Te = 5880K, M = 1.14M☉, R = 0.92R☉, and above-solar metallicity. It is a young planet, with an estimated age between 0.06 and 0.14 Gyr.

See also
COROT-20b

References

Brown dwarfs
Exoplanets discovered in 2018
Monoceros (constellation)